The coffee industry of Kenya is noted for its cooperative system of production, processing, milling, marketing, and auction system. About 70% of Kenyan coffee is produced by small- scale holders. It was estimated in 2012 that there were about 150,000 coffee farmers in Kenya and other estimates are that six million Kenyans were employed directly or indirectly in the coffee industry. The major coffee-growing regions in Kenya are the high plateaus around Mount Kenya, the Aberdare Range, Kisii, Nyanza, Bungoma, Nakuru, Kericho and to a smaller scale in Machakos and Taita hills in Eastern and coast provinces respectively. .

The acidic soil in highlands of central Kenya, just the right amount of sunlight and rainfall provide excellent conditions for growing coffee plants. Coffee from Kenya is of the  'Colombia mild' type, and is well known for its intense flavor, full body, and pleasant aroma with notes of cocoa and high grade coffee from Kenya is one of the most sought-after coffees in the world.  However, due to a property boom in areas that grew coffee and price instability, production in this African Great Lakes country fell from about 130,000 metric tons in 1987/8 to 40,000 tons in 2011/12.

History

Despite its proximity to Ethiopia (widely believed to be the region from which coffee originated), one source states that coffee was not cultivated in Kenya until 1893, when French Holy Ghost Fathers introduced coffee trees from Reunion Island. The mission farms near Nairobi, the capital city of Kenya,  were used as the nucleus around which Kenyan coffee growing developed. Overview of the Kenyan coffee industry Another reference claims the British introduced coffee growing into Kenya about 1900. In 1933 the Coffee Act was passed, establishing the Kenyan Coffee Board and moving the sale of coffee back to Kenya. In the early 1950's, an agricultural act was passed to create family holdings that combined subsistence farming with the production of cash crops for additional income. This act was known as the Swynnerton Plan.

Screen size
While it may be widely known as a type of Kenya coffee, Kenya AA is actually a classification of coffee grown in Kenya. All Kenyan coffee is graded after it is milled. Grades are assigned based on the screen size of the bean. Beans with a screen size of 17 or 18 (17/64 or 18/64 of an inch) are assigned the grade AA, generally the largest bean. While the large bean size is considered by many to be a sign of quality, it is important to note that it is only one of many factors in determining high quality coffee.

Kenya Coffee is traded once a week at the Nairobi Coffee Exchange. It is based at The Wakulima House, Exchange Lane which is off Haile Selassie Avenue.

The coffee is packed in single sisal bags of 60 kg, but the bids are made per 50 kg bag.

Below is a sample of average prices of coffee (per 50 kg bag) at the auction.
 AA - $377.20
 AB - $317.42
 C - $239.19
 PB - $308.93
 T - $183.70
 TT - $252.51
 UG1 -$198.06
 UG2 -$104.81
 UG3- $116.63

Notable coffee estates, cooperatives and factories 
MAGUTA COFFEE ESTATE - Nyeri, Muruguru (Specialty Organic Coffee & origin trips)
 Kipkelion District Co-operative Union including Mill Factory serving more than 40,000 farmers 
 Gikanda Cooperative Society — Gichathaini, Kangocho and Ndaroini Factories (Mathira, Nyeri)
 Kirimiri (Thika)
Kibirigwi Farmers Cooperative Society (kirinyaga)
 New Gikaru (Nyeri-Mukurwe-ini)
 Tekangu Cooperative Society — Tegu, Karogoto and Ngunguru Factories (Mathira, Nyeri)
 Thiriku Farmers Co-op Society (Thingingi Area, Nyeri)
 Mutheka Farmers Co-operative Society - Chorong'i Coffee Factory (Nyeri) ,   Kigwandi Coffee Factory (Nyeri), Kihuyo Coffee Factory (Nyeri) , Muthuaini Coffee Factory (Nyeri) , Kamuyu Coffee Factory (Nyeri) , Kaihuri Coffee Factory (Nyeri)
 Iyego Farmers Cooperative Society - Main, Mununga, Gatubu, Marimira, Gitura, Kirangano, Watuha (Murang'a)
·Karunguru coffee estate (Juja Kenya)
Othaya Co-operative Society (Othaya, Nyeri)
Rung'eto Farmers Co-operative Society - Kii, Karimikui and Kiangoi Factories (Kirinyaga County, Ngariama ward)
Baragwi Farmers Co-operative Society - Karumandi, Kianyaga, Gachame Factories
Meru Central Coffee Coopararive Union - along Meru-Embu Highway

See also

 Sasini Tea & Coffee
 Coffee production in Uganda
 Coffee production in Tanzania

Notes 

7. Hyde, David. ‘Paying for the Emergency by displacing the settlers’: global coffee and rural restructuring in late colonial Kenya. Journal of Global History Volume 4 Number 1 2009.

8. Hyde, David. Coffee and Decolonisation in Kenya: Overproduction, Quotas and Rural Restructuring. Commodities of Empire Working Paper Number 8, July 2008. 
https://commoditiesofempire.org.uk/publications/working-papers/working-paper-8/ [Commodities of Empire is a British Academy Research Project, based at the University of Birmingham’s Centre for Modern and Contemporary History].

External links

 International Coffee Organization: Exports by Exporting Countries
 Overview of the Kenyan coffee industry

Economy of Kenya
Agriculture in Kenya
Kenya